Kenneth John Hyslop (born 14 February 1951 in Helensburgh, Scotland) is a Scottish drummer.

He joined the band Salvation with Midge Ure, which later became Slik and, after Ure's departure, some of the remaining members formed the Zones. He also went on to play with the Skids. In 1981, he joined Simple Minds, replacing Brian McGee. He contributed by recording "Promised You a Miracle" and appeared in the videos of "Sweat in Bullet" and "Love Song", from the Sons and Fascination album, which he did not appear on, but helped to promote. Following his departure from Simple Minds in 1982, Hyslop formed Set the Tone with bass player Bobby Paterson. Following the demise of Set the Tone, Hyslop formed the One O'Clock Gang which released an album on Arista Records.

He went on to write songs for Les McKeown and also toured with Midge Ure on his The Gift World Tour 1985. Hyslop became an alternative DJ until leaving the UK for Canada with the blues band, Big George and the Business. After returning to the UK, Hyslop started teaching drumming at Carlton Studios in Glasgow as well as producing new music published through Myspace.

References

External links
Kenny Hyslop's drum lessons website

Living people
1951 births
People from Helensburgh
Scottish rock drummers
British male drummers
Simple Minds members
Scottish new wave musicians
Slik members
Zones (band) members